Peter Newmark (12 April 1916 – 9 July 2011) was an English professor of translation at the University of Surrey.

Biography
Newmark was born on 12 April 1916 in Brno in what was then the Austro-Hungarian Empire, now the Czech Republic. He was one of the main figures in the founding of Translation Studies in the English-speaking world in twentieth century. He was also very influential in the Spanish-speaking world.

He is widely read through a series of accessible and occasionally polemical works: A Textbook of Translation (1988), Paragraphs on Translation (1989), About Translation (1991), More Paragraphs on Translation (1998).

He was associated with the founding and development of the Centre for Translation Studies at Surrey. He was chair of the editorial board of The Journal of Specialised Translation. He also wrote "Translation Now" bimonthly for The Linguist and was an Editorial Board Member of the Institute of Linguists.

Newmark died on 9 July 2011.

References

External links
Peter Newmark obituary, The Guardian, 28 September 2011
 Issue 17, January 2012, including 3 tributes to Peter Newmark, "JoSTrans. The Journal of Specialised Translation"  Jan Cambridge: Peter Newmark‘s influence on my world of languages: a personal perspective for translators; Ann Corsellis: A non-academic view of Peter Newmark for translators; Jeremy Munday: Some personal memories of Peter Newmark for translators.

1916 births
2011 deaths
Czechoslovak emigrants to the United Kingdom
People from Brno
People from the Margraviate of Moravia
British translation scholars
20th-century British translators
People educated at Rugby School
Academics of the University of Surrey